Nəmirli (also, Namarly and Namyrly) is a village in the Agdam Rayon of Azerbaijan.

References 

Populated places in Aghdam District